The Guácharo Cave National Park is located  from the town of Caripe, Monagas, Venezuela.  It has as its centerpiece a large limestone cave.

The cave was visited in 1799 by Alexander von Humboldt, who realised that the thousands of oilbirds ( in Spanish; scientific name Steatornis caripensis) which live in the cave belonged to a species unknown to science. Humboldt named the frugivorous, nocturnal species after the town of Caripe.

The cave 

The temperature inside the cave generally remains near  and the humidity at 100%.

Guácharo bird 

Oilbirds are fruit-eating birds that live within the first section of the cave; they leave at night in search of food. The Spanish name  is onomatopoeic, and comes from an old Castilian word for one who shrieks or cries, because of their characteristic sound. They are brown with black and white spots, have a long tail and bristles around their beak. The  produce an organic layer in the cave called guano, formed by excrement and vomited seeds, which provide the basic nutrients for the cave's ecosystem.

The most important daily event in the park occurs in the evening, as dusk falls, when the birds exit the cave in great flocks, in search of food.  Visitors are able to view the birds leaving the cave.

Conservation 
The cave was designated as Venezuela's first National Monument in 1949.

The National Park was created in 1975 to conserve the cave and the forest ecosystem where the oilbirds feed.
There are 367 species of bird in the national park, which has been designated an Important Bird Area (IBA). Although the oilbird is not an endangered species, several other resident birds fall into this category, for example the Venezuelan flowerpiercer (Diglossa venezuelensis) and the Venezuelan sylph.

Humboldt Museum 
Near to the cave entrance is the Humboldt Museum. It offers information about the cave, the national park, the oilbird, and Alexander Von Humboldt.

Notes

References

External links

Guácharo Cave spelunking site
Caripe.net - Spanish site about Caripe 

National parks of Venezuela
Birdwatching sites in Venezuela
Important Bird Areas of Venezuela
Caves of Venezuela
Protected areas established in 1949
Geography of Monagas
Natural monuments of Venezuela
Tourist attractions in Monagas